The International League Against Epilepsy was started in 1909. Its goal is to improve the lives of people with epilepsy through research.

They run the medical journals Epilepsia, Epilepsia Open, and Epileptic Disorders.

References

External links

 

Epilepsy organizations